Gregory Raleigh Bingham (born March 13, 1951) is a former National Football League linebacker, who played from 1973 through 1985 for the Houston Oilers. He played football at Chicago's Gordon Tech High School as a tight end and linebacker and was the team's leading tackler.

Bingham went on from Gordon Tech to play middle guard / nose tackle for the Purdue Boilermakers, starting 1971 through 1973, his last three years.  Known for "going all out on every single play", Bingham earned first-team All-Big Ten honors in his sophomore and junior years of 1971 and 1972 and likely would have repeated in 1973 his senior year if not for breaking his ankle in an early season upset of then-ranked #3 Stanford University in Palo Alto.

Bingham is a noted coin collector and has owned an extensive collection of commemorative half dollars, as well as a complete collection of Morgan dollars.

External links

1951 births
Living people
American football linebackers
Purdue Boilermakers football players
Houston Oilers players
Sportspeople from Evanston, Illinois